Gopło  is a lake in Kuyavian-Pomeranian Voivodeship, north-central Poland, near the city of Gniezno. It gives its name to the protected area called Gopło Landscape Park.

In early Middle Ages, the shores of Lake Gopło were home to a West Slavic tribe of Goplans. At the northern end of the lake stands the "Mice Tower" of Kruszwica. Its name derives from a legend of the corrupt Prince Popiel, who fled to the tower from his rebelling population, and was devoured there by mice. Some historians and archaeologists consider the area the heart of the first state of the Polans, the "founding" tribe of Poland.

Notes

References
 Lozny, Ludomir (2004), "The Transition to Statehood in Central Europe", in Grinin, Leonid E, et al. (eds.), The Early State, Its Alternatives and Analogues, Saratov: Uchitel Publishing House, pp. 278–87

Lakes of Poland
Lakes of Kuyavian-Pomeranian Voivodeship